The Havana Film Festival is a Cuban festival that focuses on the promotion of Latin American filmmakers. It is also known in Spanish as Festival Internacional del Nuevo Cine Latinoamericano de La Habana, and in English as International Festival of New Latin American Cinema of Havana. It takes place every year during December in the city of Havana, Cuba.

History
The inaugural International Festival of New Latin American Cinema was held on December 3, 1979, and more than 600 film directors of Latin America responded to the first call made by the Cuban Institute of the Cinematographic Art and Industry (ICAIC). Its founders included ICAIC president Alfredo Guevara, and the filmmakers Julio García Espinosa and Pastor Vega. 

As expressed in its founding convocation, the festival aimed to "promote the regular meeting of Latin American filmmakers who with their work enrich the artistic culture of our countries (…); ensure the joint presentation of fiction films, documentaries, cartoons and current events (…), and contribute to the international diffusion and circulation of the main and most significant productions of our cinematographies".

The inaugural festival hosted over 600 filmmakers from across Latin America. Colombian author Gabriel García Márquez as president of the Fiction jury and Cuban filmmaker Santiago Álvarez as president of the jury for Documentaries and Animation. The Coral Grand Prize winners were Colonel Delmiro Gouveia (dir. Geraldo Sarno, Brazil) and Maluala (dir. Sergio Giral, Cuba) in Fiction, The Battle of Chile: the Struggle of a People Without Arms (dir. Patricio Gúzman, Chile) in Documentary, and Elpidio Valdés (dir. Juan Padrón, Cuba) in Animation.

In 2013, following the death of current President and co-founder Alfredo Guevara the Havana Film Festival announced that it was reappointing Iván Giroud as its President. Giroud had previously served as President from 1994-2010.

Awards
Within the following categories, approximately 40 awards are given:
 Films
 Documentaries
 Animation
 First Work
 Direction
 Cinematography
 Other Awards, including a FIPRESCI prize

Grand Coral - First Prize winners (Fiction)

Awards by nation

Footnotes

See also
 Cartagena Film Festival
 Guadalajara International Film Festival
Havana Film Festival New York
 Huelva Ibero American Film Festival
 Lima Film Festival
 Morelia International Film Festival
 Santiago International Film Festival
 Valdivia International Film Festival
 Viña del Mar International Film Festival

External links
Official website 
Havana Film Festival at the Internet Movie Database

Cuban film awards
Film festivals in Cuba
Film festivals established in 1979
1979 establishments in Cuba
Latin American film festivals